Loch Lomond is a reservoir in the Santa Cruz Mountains near Lompico in Santa Cruz County, California. Part of the  Santa Cruz Water Department system, it was created by building the Newell Creek Dam across Newell Creek – a tributary of the San Lorenzo River. It was financed by bond issuance, and completed in the Fall of 1960; impounded water first ran over the spillway in March 1963.

It provides a main portion of the drinking water supply for the city of Santa Cruz, California and also supplies other nearby county areas. Boating, fishing, picnicking and hiking take place at the reservoir. No daily private boat launching is permitted. No swimming is allowed. The reservoir has a boat rental and snack shop and is open every day from March 1 to September 15, and weekends only from Labor Day to October 17.

Surrounding the reservoir is the Loch Lomond Recreation Area, which is owned and operated by the City of Santa Cruz Water Department. It has hiking trails, picnic areas, and boating access.

See also
 List of lakes of California

References

External links

 Santa Cruz City Official Site
 
 Description of Loch Lomond hiking trails
 Santa Cruz Water Department

Reservoirs in Santa Cruz County, California
Reservoirs in California
Reservoirs in Northern California